The Protocol to the 1979 Convention on Long-Range Transboundary Air Pollution on the Reduction of Sulphur Emissions or their Transboundary Fluxes by at least 30 per cent is a 1985 protocol to the Convention on Long-Range Transboundary Air Pollution agreement that provided for a 30 per cent reduction in sulphur emissions or transboundary fluxes by 1993. The protocol has been supplemented by the 1994 Oslo Protocol on Further Reduction of Sulphur Emissions. By 1993, most of the countries that participated in the agreement reported reaching the goal and some countries reported even greater sulphur reductions.  

opened for signature - July 8, 1985

entered into force - September 2, 1987

parties - (25) Albania, Austria, Belarus, Belgium, Bulgaria, Canada, Czech Republic, Denmark, Estonia, Finland, France, Germany, Hungary, Italy, Liechtenstein, Lithuania, Luxembourg, Netherlands, North Macedonia, Norway, Russia, Slovakia, Sweden, Switzerland, Ukraine

See also
 United Nations Interim Force in Lebanon

References

External links
 "1985 Helsinki Protocol on the Reduction of Sulphur Emissions or their Transboundary Fluxes by at least 30 per cent", unece.org.
Text.
Signatures and ratifications.

Environmental treaties
Sulfur
Treaties concluded in 1985
Treaties entered into force in 1987
1985 in Finland
1987 in the environment
Treaties of Albania
Treaties of Austria
Treaties of the Byelorussian Soviet Socialist Republic
Treaties of Belgium
Treaties of the People's Republic of Bulgaria
Treaties of Canada
Treaties of the Czech Republic
Treaties of Czechoslovakia
Treaties of Denmark
Treaties of Estonia
Treaties of Finland
Treaties of France
Treaties of West Germany
Treaties of East Germany
Treaties of the Hungarian People's Republic
Treaties of Italy
Treaties of Liechtenstein
Treaties of Lithuania
Treaties of Luxembourg
Treaties of North Macedonia
Treaties of the Netherlands
Treaties of Norway
Treaties of the Soviet Union
Treaties of Slovakia
Treaties of Sweden
Treaties of Switzerland
Treaties of the Ukrainian Soviet Socialist Republic
Air pollution
Waste treaties
Convention on Long-Range Transboundary Air Pollution
Treaties extended to the Faroe Islands
Treaties extended to Greenland
Treaties extended to West Berlin
United Nations Economic Commission for Europe treaties